In Major League Baseball (MLB), the 20–20–20 club is the group of batters who have collected 20 doubles, 20 triples and 20 home runs in a single season.  Frank Schulte was the first to achieve this, doing so in 1911.  The last players to reach the milestone – Curtis Granderson and Jimmy Rollins – attained 20–20–20 during the 2007 season.  This marked the first time that two players accomplished the achievement in the same season.

In total, seven players are members of the 20–20–20 club.  Of these, five were left-handed batters, one was right-handed and one was a switch hitter, meaning he could bat from either side of the plate.  Two players – George Brett and Willie Mays – are also members of the 3,000 hit club, and Mays is also a member of the 500 home run club.  Schulte, Rollins, and Jim Bottomley won the Most Valuable Player (MVP) Award in the same year as their 20–20–20 season.  Both Mays and Rollins joined the club while also hitting 30 home runs and stealing 30 bases that same season to join the 30–30 club.  Brett and Rollins collected more than 200 hits alongside achieving 20–20–20.  Furthermore, four players amassed 20 or more stolen bases during their 20–20–20 season.  These players are collectively referred to as the 20–20–20–20 club.

Historically, there have been numerous players who have hit 20 doubles and 20 home runs in a year.  It is the component of triples, however, that makes the 20–20–20 club so difficult to achieve.  This is because hitting triples often comes under a similar hit placement as doubles, but may require impressive speed on the part of the runner.  This would pose a challenge for both a slugger, who may be slower at running the bases and have the tendency to hit line drives and fly balls out of the park for a home run, as well as a speedster, who may be more swift around the bases but may not supply much power to drive the ball far.

Due to the rare occurrence and low membership of the 20–20–20 club, Baseball Digest called it "the most exclusive club in the Majors" in 1979, when there were only four members.  Of the five members eligible for the Baseball Hall of Fame, three have been elected and two were elected on the first ballot.  Players are eligible for the Hall of Fame if they have played in at least 10 MLB seasons, and have either been retired for five seasons or deceased for at least six months.  These requirements leave 2 players ineligible who are living and have played in the past five seasons.

Members

20–20–20–20 club

See also

 40–40 club, similar multiple stat club for home runs and stolen bases.
 Baseball statistics
 Triple Crown

References

Major League Baseball lists
Major League Baseball statistics